Lasiothyris cerastes is a species of moth of the family Tortricidae. It is found in Costa Rica. It belongs to the Lasiothyris genus.

References

Moths described in 1986
Cochylini